American R&B singer Macy Gray has released 10 studio albums, one live album, three compilation albums, 32 singles (including seven as a featured artist), seven promotional singles, and 21 music videos.  

Gray has received five Grammy Award nominations, winning one. She has appeared in a number of films including Training Day, Spider-Man, Scary Movie 3, Lackawanna Blues, Idlewild, and For Colored Girls. Gray is known for her international hit single "I Try", taken from her multi-platinum debut album On How Life Is.

Albums

Studio albums

Live albums

Compilation albums

Singles

As lead artist

As featured artist

Promotional singles

Guest appearances

Music videos

As lead artist

As featured artist

Notes

References

External links
 
 
 
 

Discographies of American artists
Rhythm and blues discographies
Soul music discographies